The following is a list of events affecting Canadian television in 2009. Events listed include television show debuts, finales, cancellations, and channel launches, closures and rebrandings.

Events

Television programs

Programs debuting in 2009

Programs ending in 2009

Films and miniseries
Booky's Crush - CBC
Soul - VisionTV
The Summit - CBC

Deaths

Television stations

Network affiliation changes

Closures

See also
 2009 in Canada
 List of Canadian films of 2009

References